The Merlion Masters was a golf tournament that was held in Singapore in 1995 and 1996. It was an event on the Asian Tour.

The Merlion Masters was hosted at Laguna National Golf and Country Club in 1995, when it was won by South African Nico van Rensburg, and the SAFRA Resort in 1996, when Singapore resident Peter Teravainen won the title in a sudden-death playoff.

Winners

Notes

References

Former Asian Tour events
Golf tournaments in Singapore
Recurring sporting events established in 1995
Recurring sporting events disestablished in 1996
1995 establishments in Singapore
1996 disestablishments in Singapore